Michael Bowers is a singer-songwriter who splits time between Cozumel, Mexico and Austin, Texas.  He has retired from touring, and currently works for EMDRIA. When he did tour, he toured nationally, both solo and with his spouse, Siobhan Quinn, formerly of Troy, New York.  Bowers was a finalist in the 2005 and 2007 Kerrville New Folk competition and a 2006 South Florida Folk Finalist. Both of these national competitions are among the top recognitions in the singer-songwriter community.  In 2007, along with Quinn, he was recognized as an Emerging Artist at the Falcon Ridge Folk Festival, which is held every July in New York state. In 2008, he was recognized by ASCAP with an ASCAP Plus Award.

His first recording "Angel on My Shoulder" was referred to as "folk with an attitude" and it received airplay in several European countries, including Ireland, England, Belgium, Portugal, Italy, and Sweden, and across the continent through the European Broadcast Corporation.  Additionally, it received airplay across Australia.  His live shows have been frequently referred to as "urban campfire music."  His second album, produced by Tom Prasada-Rao, has received significant airplay in the U.S. and was positively reviewed in Sing Out! Magazine.  He has had songs covered and sung by Tom Kimmel and Cary Cooper on Cooper's album, Gypsy Train.

His third album, Dreamers, Lovers, and Outlaws, with his spouse, Siobhan Quinn, charted in Folk Radio in the US in 2007, and his song, "Let It Come", charted as one of the most played songs by folk radio stations in 2007.

Discography
Angel on My Shoulder (1999)
Reluctant Believer (2004)
Dreamers, Lovers, and Outlaws (2007), with Siobhan Quinn

External links
Official website
Roundhouse music
Dreamers, Lovers, and Outlaws

Year of birth missing (living people)
Living people
American male singer-songwriters
Musicians from Alexandria, Virginia
Singer-songwriters from Virginia